David Haines may refer to:

 David Haines (aid worker) (1970–2014), British humanitarian aid worker
 David Haines (artist) (born 1969), British artist